The Ruger Security-9 is a 9mm caliber single-action semi-automatic pistol announced by Sturm, Ruger & Co. on November 22, 2017.

History
Introduced in late 2017, Ruger intended to use the Security-9 to replace both the Ruger SR-Series and the Ruger LCP II. The Security-9 managed to be even less expensive than the SR-Series as it eliminated the adjustable backstrap and ambidextrous magazine release, used an internal hammer-fired mechanism instead of a striker-fired mechanism and hardened aluminum alloy rails instead of steel rails. The Security-9 was primarily aimed at the affordable handgun demographic.

Design
The unique design and action of the Security 9 pistol is derived from firearms first designed and produced by Kel-Tec, circa 1995.   

The trigger on the Security-9, despite being a double action only, is very light. Ruger calls this mechanism the "Secure Action" design, and it combines the trigger pull of the LCP with single-action, as it has a positive reset. It also has a hammer that provides a strong ignition force that has a slide racking to make it much easier to slide. The pistol also features a sight system with drift adjustable rear sight and a fixed front sight. It also has a strong spring tension; the hammer catch to help prevent the hammer from contacting the firing pin unless the trigger is pulled, which makes it safer. 

The Ruger Security-9, like the Ruger American Pistol and the SR-Series, has a polymer frame made out of glass-filled nylon. The Security-9 comes with 15 round magazines, and will function with SR-Series magazines. Security-9 magazines will also function in the Ruger SR9c. The Ruger Security-9 does not feature the ambidexterity, finish and ergonomics of the SR-Series, however it does feature several things the full-sized SR9 did not, including front cocking serrations and a standard Picatinny rail for accessories. However, takedown of the Security-9 is slightly more difficult since you have to remove a small takedown pin.

Variants
When they were first introduced in 2017, the Security-9 model was offered with 15 or 10 round magazines, and certain models came from the factory with a Viridian E-Series Red Laser on the accessory rail.

In 2019, Ruger introduced the Security-9 Compact. Designed for concealed carry, the Compact model features a shorter slide, barrel and frame and feeds from 10 round magazines. 

Also in 2019, Ruger introduced the Security-9 Pro series. The Pro models are a higher-end version of the standard Security-9 and Security-9 Compact, but feature factory-installed steel tritium night sights and no manual thumb safety.

Ruger also offers the Security-9 in different colors, such as flat dark earth, two-tone and light blue.

References

External links 
 
 Security-9 Official Announcement Press Release

Ruger semi-automatic pistols
9mm Parabellum semi-automatic pistols
Semi-automatic pistols of the United States
Weapons and ammunition introduced in 2017